Stephan Keenan Hicks (born April 2, 1992) is an American professional basketball player. He played college basketball for Cal State Northridge.

High school career
Hicks initially attended Agoura High School averaging 17 points, 9.8 rebounds and 2.1 steals per game as a junior. For his senior season he transferred to National College Prep tallying 18 points and six rebounds per game, gaining all-tournament accolades at the Hampton Inn Invitational.

College career
Hicks attended Cal State Northridge averaging 16.0 points and 5.4 rebounds per game as a senior, earning All-Big West second team honors and finished eighth all-time in the conference in career points.

Professional career

Fort Wayne Mad Ants (2015–2020) 
On October 31, 2015, Hicks was selected by the Oklahoma City Blue in the third round of the 2015 NBA Development League Draft and later that night traded to the Fort Wayne Mad Ants in exchange for a 2016 second round pick to Oklahoma City and the rights to James Carlton. On November 15, he made his professional debut in a 112–92 win over Raptors 905, recording two points, two rebounds and a steal in four minutes.

On October 31, 2016, Hicks was reacquired by Fort Wayne.

On January 20, 2019, after four years of G League basketball, Hicks was called up to the Indiana Pacers on a 10-day contract,  but did not make an appearance in a game.

On October 17, 2019, Hicks was reported to have signed with the Indiana Pacers but was later reported to have released by the Indiana Pacers two days later. On October 26, 2019, Hicks was included in the training camp roster for the Fort Wayne Mad Ants. On November 6, 2019, Hicks was included in the opening night roster of the Fort Wayne Mad Ants. In the shortened 2019–20 season, Hicks averaged 14.6 points, 6.5 rebounds and 1.1 assists per game, shooting 52% from the field and 47% from behind the arc.

Formosa Taishin Dreamers (2020–2021) 
On December 12, 2020, Hicks joined Formosa Taishin Dreamers as an import player.

Samara (2021) 
On August 3, 2021, Hicks joined BC Samara.

Return to Fort Wayne (2021–2022) 
On December 13, 2021, Hicks returned to the Fort Wayne Mad Ants for a second stint. Hicks was then later waived by Fort Wayne on January 8, 2022.

TaiwanBeer HeroBears (2022) 
On August 26, 2022, Hicks signed with the TaiwanBeer HeroBears of the T1 League. On October 28, 2022, TaiwanBeer HeroBears terminated the contract relationship with Hicks due to the injury.

Personal life
The son of Kim Kitchen and Charles Hicks, he has a sister, Kristiaan, and three brothers, Kaelan, Keaton and Dylan. He majored in business.

References

External links
 Cal State Northridge Matadors bio
 RealGM profile
 Sports-Reference profile

1992 births
Living people
American men's basketball players
Basketball players from Los Angeles
Cal State Northridge Matadors men's basketball players
Fort Wayne Mad Ants players
People from Thousand Oaks, California
Shooting guards
Small forwards
Sportspeople from Ventura County, California
American expatriate basketball people in Taiwan
Formosa Taishin Dreamers players
TaiwanBeer HeroBears players
T1 League imports
P. League+ imports